Rolle is a municipality in the canton of Vaud, Switzerland.

Rolle may also refer to:

People
 Antrel Rolle (born 1982), American football safety
 Brian Rolle (born 1988), American football linebacker
 Butch Rolle (born 1964), American football tight end
 Edward Rolle (1703–1791), English author, poet, and Anglican vicar
 Esther Rolle (1920–1998), American actress
 George Rolle (died 1552), lawyer
 Hermann Rolle (1864 -1929), German entomologist
 Johann Heinrich Rolle (1716-1785), German baroque composer.
 Magnum Rolle (born 1986), Bahamian basketball player
 Marvin Rolle (born 1983), Bahamian tennis player
 Michel Rolle (1652–1719), French mathematician
 Rolle's theorem, in calculus
 Myron Rolle (born 1986), American football safety, Rhodes Scholar
 Richard Rolle (1290–1349), an English religious writer, Bible translator, and hermit
 Samari Rolle (born 1976), American football cornerback

Other uses
 Rolle (grape), a grape variety, also known as Vermentino
 Baron Rolle, a British peerage
 Rolle family, of Stevenstone, Devon, England

See also
 Roll (disambiguation)
 Role (disambiguation)